Aechmea castanea is a plant species in the genus Aechmea. This species is endemic to State of Espírito Santo in Brazil.

References

castanea
Flora of Brazil
Plants described in 1955